Savage Island is a small island in the Near Islands group of the Aleutian Islands in the U.S. state of Alaska. It was named by the U.S. Army during its occupation of Attu during World War II.

Near Islands
Islands of Alaska
Islands of Unorganized Borough, Alaska